Music For a Sunday Afternoon is a Canadian classical music television series which aired on CBC Television in 1967.

Premise
This classical music series featured mostly Canadian productions except for two episodes from the BBC.

The BBC episodes were "The Golden Ring" (broadcast 5 February 1967) and "Double Concerto" (17 February 1967). The first featured a recording of Richard Wagner's music and was previously aired on CBC's Festival. "Double Concerto" followed pianists Daniel Barenboim and Vladimir Ashkenazy as they practiced and performed a Mozart concerto.

Canadian-produced episodes included:
 a Bernardo Segall recital of Chopin's work
 Glenn Gould performing Beethoven, marking 140 years after the composer's death
 Cavalleria rusticana (Jean-Ives Landry producer), the opera by Mascagni
 an Isaac Stern recital (Pierre Morin producer)
 Les Sylphides performed by Les Grands Ballets Canadiens,

Scheduling
This hour-long series was broadcast Sundays at 3:00 p.m. (Eastern) from 5 February to 26 March 1967.

References

External links
 

CBC Television original programming
1967 Canadian television series debuts
1967 Canadian television series endings